Faiza Darkhani (born c. 1992) is an Afghan environmentalist, women's rights activist, and educator. In 2021, she was part of the 100 Women BBC list, which includes the most inspiring and influential women in the world. Darkhani is one of the few scholars of climate change within Afghanistan. She formally was the director of the National Environmental Protection Agency in Badakhshan province.

She attended the Badakhshan University; followed by study at University of Putra Malaysia (also known as Universiti Putra Malaysia) where she graduated with a with a master of science degree in landscape architecture. Her research focuses on the sustainable management of urban landscapes and the relationship between urban agriculture and food security.

See also 

 List of women climate scientists and activists

References

External links 
 

Living people
BBC 100 Women
University of Putra Malaysia alumni
Afghan women's rights activists
Afghan women activists
Women environmentalists
Year of birth missing (living people)